Amanda McRaney Jenkins (born 1961) is an American writer of young adult fiction. Her novels have received considerable recognition, including the Delacorte Prize for Breaking Boxes, and a Printz Honor for Repossessed. In 2005 she received the PEN/Phyllis Naylor Working Writer Fellowship, a stipend intended to grant a measure of financial freedom to a writer of children's or YA literature.

Jenkins was born in 1961 and has lived all her life in Texas She now lives in Benbrook with two of her three sons and assorted pets. Before writing full-time, she was a high school math teacher.

Books

References

External links
 
 
 

1961 births
Living people
20th-century American novelists
21st-century American novelists
American young adult novelists
American women novelists
People from Tarrant County, Texas
Novelists from Texas
Date of birth missing (living people)
Place of birth missing (living people)
20th-century American women writers
21st-century American women writers
Women writers of young adult literature
Educators from Texas